Roy Moore (4 July 1932 – 26 November 1996) was an Australian cyclist. He competed in the team pursuit event at the 1956 Summer Olympics.

References

External links
 

1932 births
1996 deaths
Australian male cyclists
Olympic cyclists of Australia
Cyclists at the 1956 Summer Olympics
Australian track cyclists
Place of birth missing
20th-century Australian people